Bellan Roos (25 May 1901 – 8 April 1990) was a Swedish actress. She appeared in more than 70 films and television shows between 1933 and 1979.

Selected filmography

 Boman's Boy (1933)
 Simon of Backabo (1934)
 Under False Flag (1935)
 Adventure (1936)
 Comrades in Uniform (1938)
 Career (1938)
 Wanted (1939)
 We at Solglantan (1939)
 Kiss Her! (1940)
 Heroes in Yellow and Blue (1940)
 The Three of Us (1940)
 Fransson the Terrible (1941)
 The Ghost Reporter (1941)
 The Poor Millionaire (1941)
 The Yellow Clinic (1942)
 It Is My Music (1942)
 We House Slaves (1942)
 I Am Fire and Air (1944)
 Desire (1946)
 Carnival Evening (1948)
 Big Lasse of Delsbo (1949)
 Andersson's Kalle (1950)
 Teacher's First Born (1950)
 My Sister and I (1950)
 My Name Is Puck (1951)
 Kalle Karlsson of Jularbo (1952)
 Åsa-Nisse on Holiday (1953)
 The Girl from Backafall (1953)
Seventh Heaven (1956)
 Mother Takes a Vacation (1957)
 Playing on the Rainbow (1958)
 The Great Amateur (1958)
 More Than a Match for the Navy (1958)
 We at Väddö (1958)
 Heaven and Pancake (1959)
 Rider in Blue (1959)
 Heart's Desire (1960)
 Lovely Is the Summer Night (1961)
 Äktenskapsbrottaren (1964)
 Hugo and Josephine (1967)
 The Man on the Roof (1976)

References

External links

1901 births
1990 deaths
20th-century Swedish actresses
Swedish film actresses
Swedish television actresses
People from Nynäshamn Municipality